Blerim Mazreku (born 24 October 1981) is a Kosovar professional basketball player who plays for KB Sigal Prishtina of Kosovo Basketball Superleague. He was born in Therande in Kosovo and also started the career in Theranda at KB Ylli team. Most of the times he played for Sigal Prishtina where he won 4x Kosovo Superleague, 2x Kosovo cup, 1x Kosovo Supercup and one time Balkan League. Mazreku also played for KB Peja, KB Bashkimi and for KB Mabetex.

Mazreku also is a member of the Kosovo national basketball team.

Professional career

2013–14
Blerim Mazreku in this Season played with Sigal Prishtina in Kosovo Basketball Superleague and also in Balkan League. In Kosovo Superleague he averaged with 14.3 points, 5.6 rebounds and 2.0 blocks per game in 26 games played. And in BIBL he averaged with 10.4 points, 4.9 rebounds and 1.3 blocks per game in 18 games played. In this season Mazreku with his team won Kosovo Superleague and Supercup of Kosovo.

2014–15
In this season Mazreku also played with Sigal prishtina in Kosovo superleague and in Balkan League. Mazreku in Kosovo Basketball Superleague averaged with 13.6 points, 5.0 rebounds and 1.8 assists per game in 24 games played. And in BIBL he averaged with 7.1 points, 2.6 rebounds and 1.2 blocks per game in 14 games played. Mazreku with his team in this season won Kosovo Basketball Superleague, Kosovo Cup and also Balkan League for the first time in history.

References

External links
Profile at Globalsportsplaza.com

1981 births
Living people
Kosovan men's basketball players
Kosovo Albanians
Power forwards (basketball)
People from Suva Reka
KB Prishtina players
KB Peja players
KB Ylli players
Bashkimi Prizren players